Zilpher Margaret Jennings Reed (13 June 1928 – 13 August 1961) was an American Samoan politician. In 1953 she was one of the first two women elected to the Fono, when she won a seat in the House of Representatives.

Biography
Jennings was born in Swains Island in 1928, the daughter of Margaret (née Pedro) and Eli Jennings, the owner of the island. She began working in the administration department of the American Samoan government, and married Fritz John Reed, with whom she had two sons in 1956 and 1958.

In the 1953 legislative elections, she was elected to the House of Representatives from Swains Island, one of two women elected to the House alongside Mabel Reid.

She died in 1961.

References

1928 births
American Samoan civil servants
American Samoan women in politics
Members of the American Samoa House of Representatives
1961 deaths
20th-century American politicians
20th-century American women politicians